Emiliano Redondo (1937–2014) was a Spanish film and television actor.

Partial filmography

 College Boarding House (1959) - Estudiante
 Tiempo de amor (1964) - Armando (segment "La noche")
 La nueva Cenicienta (1964)
 Megatón Ye-Ye (1965)
 El marqués (1965) - Lawyer
 Zampo y yo (1966) - El payaso loco
 Las 4 bodas de Marisol (1967)
 Peppermint Frappé (1967) - Arturo
 Pero... ¿en qué país vivimos? (1967)
 El hueso (1967)
 Persecución hasta Valencia (1968)
 Relaciones casi públicas (1969)
 Honeycomb (1969) - Antonio
 El cronicón (1970)
 Mecanismo interior (1971)
 La araucana (1971)
 Antony and Cleopatra (1972) - Mardian
 Love and Pain and the Whole Damn Thing (1973) - The Spanish Gentleman
 Autopsia (1973) - Doctor
 Los muertos, la carne y el diablo (1974)
 Solo ante el Streaking (1975) - Valentín
 Spanish Fly (1975) - Clean Domingo
 Madrid, Costa Fleming (1976) - Contestat
 La noche de los cien pájaros (1976) - Gustavo
 The People Who Own the Dark (1976) - Dr. Messier
 Nosotros que fuimos tan felices (1976) - Félix
 Viaje al centro de la Tierra (1977) - Prof. Kristoff
 La violación (1977)
 Miedo a salir de noche (1980) - Dependiente (uncredited)
 Los locos vecinos del 2º (1980) - Charly
 Los liantes (1981) - Sixto Calapeña
 Trágala, perro (1981) - Fray Andrés Rivas
 La casa del paraíso (1982)
 Cristóbal Colón, de oficio... descubridor (1982) - Toscanelli
 Morte in Vaticano (1982)
 De camisa vieja a chaqueta nueva (1982) - Padre Llaneza
 Black Venus (1983) - Jacques
 Treasure of the Four Crowns (1983) - Brother Jonas
 El currante (1983) - Aspirante a Director General
 Los caraduros (1983) - Calabazate
 Tuareg – The Desert Warrior (1984) - Prison Warden
 Christina (1984) - Jean
 ¡Qué tía la C.I.A.! (1985) - Agente de la DDR
 El elegido (1985) - Comisario
 Crystal Heart (1986) - Dr. Navarro
 Los presuntos (1986) - Mafioso español
 Fist Fighter (1989) - Delgado
 Tie Me Up! Tie Me Down! (1989) - Decorador
 Disparate nacional (1990)
 Retrato de Família (1991) - Carlos
 Shooting Elizabeth (1992) - Man
 La ley de la frontera (1995) - Prior convento
 Hermana, pero ¿qué has hecho? (1995)

References

Bibliography
 Kenneth S. Rothwell. A History of Shakespeare on Screen: A Century of Film and Television. Cambridge University Press, 2004.

External links

1937 births
2014 deaths
Spanish male film actors
Spanish male television actors